Harrigan and Son is an ABC sitcom about a father-and-son team of lawyers, played by Pat O'Brien as Jim Harrigan Sr. and Roger Perry as Jim Jr.. In supporting roles, as secretaries, are Georgine Darcy as Gypsy and Helen Kleeb as Miss Claridge. The series aired 34 episodes at 8 p.m. Eastern Time on Fridays from October 14, 1960, to September 29, 1961. It preceded ABC's cartoon series, The Flintstones. Its competition was the second half of the CBS Western, Rawhide. For the first half of the season, Harrigan and Son aired opposite the detective series Dan Raven, starring Skip Homeier.

The series premiere is titled "Junior Joins the Law Firm". The finale is called "The Testimonial". Harrigan and Son was owned and produced by Desilu Productions. 

A running gimmick in the show consisted of Harrigan Sr. commenting on some situation in Latin, Harrigan Jr., replying, "Which means?", and Harrigan Sr. translating his comment, usually humorous, into English.  The exact same gimmick had been used continually in the television show Colonel Humphrey Flack some years earlier.

The closing of show featured O'Brien and Perry, in silhouette behind the credits, singing the old George M. Cohan song, "Harrigan".

Guest stars

References

External links
 

American Broadcasting Company original programming
1960 American television series debuts
1961 American television series endings
1960s American legal television series
1960s American sitcoms
1960s American workplace comedy television series
Black-and-white American television shows
Television duos
Television series by CBS Studios
Television series by Desilu Productions